The 1992 Boston Marathon was the 96th running of the annual marathon race in Boston, United States, which was held on April 20. The elite men's race was won by Kenya's Ibrahim Hussein in a time of 2:08:14 hours and the women's race was won by Russia's Olga Markova in 2:23:43.

A total of 8123 runners finished the race, 6562 men and 1561 women.

Results

Men

Women

References

Results. Association of Road Racing Statisticians. Retrieved 2020-04-14.

External links
 Boston Athletic Association website

Boston Marathon
Boston
Boston Marathon
Marathon
Boston Marathon